One Man Village is a village in central Nigeria. It is found in Karu Local Government area of Nasarawa State. It lies close to Abuja, Federal Capital Territory, Nigeria.

References

Populated places in Nasarawa State